Momodu is given name and surname common in West Africa. Notable people with the surname include:

Given name
 Momodu Bama, second in command of the militant Islamist group Boko Haram
 Momodu Kargbo, Sierra Leonean politician and economist
 Momodu Koroma, Sierra Leonean politician
 Momodu Maligie, Sierra Leonean politician and former Minister of Water Resources for Sierra Leone.
 Momodu Munu, former diplomat from Sierra Leone.
 Momodu Mutairu, former Nigerian football player.

Surname
 Dele Momodu, Nigerian journalist